A framer is someone who frames (shapes or gives shape to), or someone who constructs.

Building industry

In building construction a framer is a carpenter who assembles the major structural elements of a wood-framed building called the framing. Framers build walls out of studs, sills, and headers; build floors from joists, beams, and trusses; and frame roofs using ridge poles and rafters or trusses. Platform framing is the most common method of construction.

Timber framing 
Timber framers are framers who work in the traditional style of timber framing, historically with wooden joinery. Timber framing is a type of light framing in which wood (as the building structure) and drywall framing are used.

Traditional chair making industry

In the traditional chair making industry, it was the bodger who produced the turned parts of a chair and  the benchman who produced the splats, side rails and other sawn parts. However it was the framer who assembled and finished the chair with the parts supplied by the bodger and benchman.

Art

Picture framer
A picture framer is the person who builds picture frames for artwork and photographs. The first carved wooden frames as we know them today appeared on small panel paintings in twelfth and thirteenth century Europe. Framed panel paintings were made from one piece. The area to be painted was carved out, leaving a raised framing border around the outside edge, like a tray. The whole piece was then gessoed and gilded. Painting the image on the flat panel was the last thing to be done. Eventually, a more efficient method was developed which used mitred moulding strips. These strips were attached to a flat wooden panel which produced a similar result to the carved panel, but were more cost effective. The modern picture framer can use a variety of materials for the frame, but essentially the framing technique remains the same.

References

Woodworking
Structural system
Construction trades workers
Chair-making
Art